Tetraponera rufonigra, is a species of ant belonging to the subfamily Pseudomyrmecinae. It is distributed across Asia, and Africa. Commonly called the Bi-coloured Arboreal ant, they are arboreal and build small nests which are excavated holes usually in dried parts of trees. They are active hunters and hunt small insects. They have a well developed sting and when stung can cause allergic reactions in human beings.

The ant is known as "Hath polayaa" in Sinhala.

Subspecies

Tetraponera rufonigra ceylonensis (Forel, 1909)
Tetraponera rufonigra rufonigra (Jerdon, 1851)
Tetraponera rufonigra testaceonigra (Forel, 1903)
Tetraponera rufonigra yeensis (Forel, 1902)

References

External links

 at antwiki.org
Animaldiversity.org
Itis.org

Pseudomyrmecinae
Hymenoptera of Asia
Insects described in 1851